Minga is a surname. Notable people with the surname include:

 Arben Minga (1959–2007), Albanian footballer
 Edson Minga (born 1979), Congolese-born Hong Kong footballer
 Jani Minga (1872–1947), Albanian educator